Betta St. John (born Betty Jean Striegler) is an American former actress, singer, and dancer who worked on Broadway and in Hollywood films. She later appeared in British films including High Tide at Noon, two Tarzan films, and the horror features Corridors of Blood with Boris Karloff and Horror Hotel with Christopher Lee.

Born in Hawthorne, California, St. John, alongside Shirley Temple, was part of the Meglin Kiddies troupe of actors, singers, and dancers.

St. John made her film debut at age ten in an uncredited part in Destry Rides Again (1939) starring James Stewart and Marlene Dietrich. She then played an orphan in Jane Eyre (1943), starring Orson Welles and Joan Fontaine, also uncredited.

She played a small role in the Rodgers and Hammerstein Broadway musical Carousel from 1945 until 1947. She was a member of the show's touring company until 1949. Later that year, she created the role of Liat in the musical South Pacific, first on Broadway and then London.

St. John appeared in the 1953 films The Robe, Dream Wife, and All the Brothers Were Valiant, as well as 1954's The Student Prince. She continued to act in films and television until 1965, when she retired.

St. John was married to English actor Peter Grant from 1952 until his death in 1992. They had three children.

Filmography

References

External links

 
 
 Photographs of Betta St. John

20th-century American actresses
Living people
American child actresses
American film actresses
American television actresses
Actresses from California
People from Hawthorne, California
American stage actresses
21st-century American women
1929 births